Johan Andersson (born 7 May 1995) is a Swedish footballer who plays for Tvååker as a defender.

Career
Andersson has played for Öster, IFK Värnamo and Lund.

References

1995 births
Living people
Swedish footballers
Östers IF players
IFK Värnamo players
Lunds BK players
Tvååkers IF players
Superettan players
Allsvenskan players
Ettan Fotboll players
Association football defenders
People from Värnamo Municipality
Sportspeople from Jönköping County